Eduardo Nava (born 26 August 1968) was a Mexican sprinter. He competed in the men's 100 metres at the 1988 Summer Olympics. Nava's son Emilio is a professional tennis player.

References

External links
 

1968 births
Living people
Athletes (track and field) at the 1987 Pan American Games
Athletes (track and field) at the 1988 Summer Olympics
Athletes (track and field) at the 1992 Summer Olympics
Mexican male sprinters
Olympic athletes of Mexico
World Athletics Championships athletes for Mexico
Pan American Games competitors for Mexico
Place of birth missing (living people)
20th-century Mexican people
21st-century Mexican people